Ivan Hope Price (born 6 March 2000), better known as Hopey Price, is a British professional boxer. As an amateur, he won silver medals at the 2017 European Youth Championships and 2018 Youth World Championships, and gold at the 2018 European Youth Championships and 2018 Youth Olympics; becoming the first boxer from Great Britain to win gold at a Youth Olympic Games.

Professional career
In October 2019, it was announced Price had signed a promotional contract with Eddie Hearn's Matchroom Boxing and would make his professional debut the following month. The fight took place on 2 November 2019 at the Manchester Arena, Manchester, with Price scoring a four-round points decision victory over Joel Sanchez on the undercard of Katie Taylor's world title challenge against Christina Linardatou. Price was back in action one month later to defeat Swedi Mohamed via third-round technical knockout (TKO) on 7 December at the Diriyah Arena in Diriyah, Saudi Arabia.

Hopey continued his run of wins with a points victory over Claudio Grande in a six round fight on 14 August 2021 and then with a 2nd round stoppage of Zahid Hussain on 4 September 2021.

Professional boxing record

References

English male boxers
2000 births
Living people
Super-bantamweight boxers
Boxers at the 2018 Summer Youth Olympics
Sportspeople from Leeds
Youth Olympic gold medalists for Great Britain
Youth and Junior World Boxing Championships medalists